Silvology (Latin: silva or sylva, "forests and woods"; , -logia, "science of" or "study of") is the biological science of studying forests and woodlands, incorporating the understanding of natural forest ecosystems, and the effects and development of silvicultural practices. The term complements silviculture, which deals with the art and practice of forest management.

Silvology is seen as a single science for forestry and was first used by Roeloff Oldeman. It integrates the study of forests and forest ecology, dealing with single tree autecology and natural forest ecology.

Relationship with dendrology and other terms
Arboriculture is the management of individual trees.
Dendrology is the study of woody plants, a branch of botany.
Forestry is the management of forests and woods.
Horticulture is the culture of plants.
Silviculture concerns the culture of forests and woods.

Noted silvologists
Gabriel Hemery
Carl Ditters von Dittersdorf

See also
 Dendrochronology
 Forest ecology

References

External links
www.silvology.com

Dendrology
Forestry